Cedric Smith is an American painter. He was a 2003 Artist-in-Residence at the McColl Center for Visual Art in Charlotte, North Carolina.

Life and work
Smith was born in Philadelphia in 1970 and grew up in Thomaston, Georgia, where he moved with his family as a young boy. He currently resides in Macon, Georgia. His first gallery show was at the Barbara Archer Gallery in Atlanta. Six of his images have been released as posters by publisher Image Conscious of San Francisco.

References

20th-century American painters
American male painters
21st-century American painters
21st-century American male artists
1971 births
Living people
Artists from Georgia (U.S. state)
People from Thomaston, Georgia
Artists from Philadelphia
20th-century African-American painters
21st-century African-American artists
20th-century American male artists